Brittle is a type of confection consisting of flat broken pieces of hard sugar candy embedded with nuts such as pecans, almonds, or peanuts, and which are usually less than 1 cm thick.

Types
It has many variations around the world, such as pasteli in Greece; sohan in Iran; croquant in France; alegría or palanqueta in Mexico; panocha mani, panutsa mani, or samani in the Philippines (which can also be made with pili nut); gozinaki in Georgia; gachak in Indian Punjab, chikki in other parts of India; kotkoti in Bangladesh; sohan halwa in Pakistan;   huasheng tang (花生糖) in China; thua tat (ถั่วตัด) in Thailand; and kẹo lạc, kẹo hạt điều in Vietnam. In parts of the Middle East, brittle is made with pistachios, while many Asian countries use sesame seeds and peanuts. Peanut brittle is the most popular brittle recipe in the United States. The term "brittle" in the context of the food first appeared in print in 1892, though the candy itself has been around for much longer.

Preparation
Nuts are mixed with the caramelized sugar. At this point spices, leavening agents, and often peanut butter or butter are added. The hot candy is poured out onto a flat surface for cooling, traditionally a granite, a marble slab or a baking sheet. The hot candy may be troweled to uniform thickness. When the brittle is cool enough to handle, it is broken into pieces. It is also rare to break the brittle into equal pieces.

Nougatine 
Nougatine is a similar confection to brittle, but made of sliced almonds instead of whole peanuts, which are embedded in clear caramel.

See also

 Almond Roca
 Caramel
 Chikki
 Florentine biscuit
 Frankfurter Kranz
 Gajak
 Dalgona
 Ka'í Ladrillo
 List of peanut dishes
 Nougat
 Pé-de-moleque (in Brazil)
 Praliné
 Toffee
 Turrón (in Spain)

References

External links
 

Cuisine of the Southern United States
Peanut dishes
Nut confections